Salim Baig is an Indian actor who has appeared in Telugu and Tamil language films. He is best known for his collaborations with director Gautham Vasudev Menon, having notably appeared as the antagonist in the police dramas Gharshana (2004) and Vettaiyaadu Vilaiyaadu (2006). The success of the films prompted several filmmakers to cast him in similar negative roles in the late 2000s.

Career
Salim Baig was born and brought up in Mumbai and began his career in the entertainment industry as a model and then as a theatre artiste. Soon after competing in the Mr. Junior Mumbai competition, he received a call from director Teja who subsequently cast him in the Telugu action film, Jai (2004). The film's cinematographer Ravi Varman introduced him to director Gautham Vasudev Menon, who gave Salim his acting breakthrough, by casting him as a notorious gangster seeking revenge in the police drama Gharshana (2004). The success of the film prompted him to use his character name of "Panda" as a suffix to his stage name. About his performance, a critic from Indiaglitz.com wrote "newcomer Saleem Baig, despite a poor voice (dubbed), as the cold-blooded, revenge-seeking Panda is first rate" and that "he never misses a trick in the book and triumphs in this significant role for him". The opportunity allowed him to work on more big budget Telugu films such as Chiranjeevi's Andarivaadu (2005), Jagapati (2005) and Andhrudu (2005) during the following year. Menon then cast him again in his first Tamil film, the police drama Vettaiyaadu Vilaiyaadu (2006) which had Kamal Haasan in the lead role, Alongside Daniel Balaji, Salim portrayed a homosexual medical student who turns into a psycho killer, and the film opened to critical and commercial acclaim.

Filmography

References

External links 

Indian male film actors
Male actors in Tamil cinema
Male actors in Telugu cinema
Male actors in Kannada cinema
Living people
Year of birth missing (living people)